Bompata is a town in the Ashanti Region of Ghana. The town is known for the Bompata Presby Secondary School.  The school is a second cycle institution. Nana Effah-Apenteng has served as the traditional ruler (paramount chief)  for the Bompata Traditional area since 1976.

References

Populated places in the Ashanti Region